If You See Him is the twenty-second  studio album by American country music singer Reba McEntire released on June 2, 1998. The lead single was "If You See Him/If You See Her", a duet with Brooks & Dunn, which was concurrently released on Brooks & Dunn's corresponding album If You See Her; the song reached Number One on the Hot Country Songs charts in 1998. "Forever Love", "Wrong Night" and "One Honest Heart" were all released as singles from the album as well, all of which reached Top 10 on the same chart.

The album debuted at number 2 on the Country Albums chart and number 8 on the Billboard 200 for the week dated June 20, 1998 with 93,000 copies sold in the first week. It stayed in the Top 10 for 13 weeks on the former.

The album was released as an Enhanced CD, featuring a multimedia presentation that included behind-the-scenes videos and pictures.

A bonus limited edition EP was made available when consumers bought both If You See Him and Brooks & Dunn's If You See Her at the same time.

Track listing

Personnel 
Per the liner notes.
 Reba McEntire – lead vocals
 John Barlow Jarvis – Rhodes piano (1), acoustic piano (2-12)
 Randy McCormick – synthesizers (1)
 Jimmy Nichols – keyboards (2-12), backing vocals (2-12)
 Larry Byrom – electric guitar (1)
 Brent Mason – electric guitar (1)
 Dann Huff – electric guitar (2-12)
 Jeff King – electric guitar (2-12)
 Jerry McPherson – electric guitar (2-12)
 Bobby All – acoustic guitar (1)
 Mark Casstevens – acoustic guitar (1)
 B. James Lowry – acoustic guitar (2-12)
 Bruce Bouton – pedal steel guitar (1)
 Paul Franklin – pedal steel guitar (2-12)
 Rob Hajacos – fiddle (1)
 Larry Franklin – fiddle (2-12), mandolin (2-12)
 Michael Rhodes – bass guitar (1)
 Richard "Spady" Brannan – bass guitar (2-12)
 Lonnie Wilson – drums (1)
 Paul Leim – drums (2-12)
 Kix Brooks – backing vocals (1)
 Ronnie Dunn – lead vocals (1)
 John Wesley Ryles – backing vocals (1)
 Cynthia French – backing vocals (2-12
 Lisa Gregg – backing vocals (2-12)
 Liana Manis – backing vocals (2-12)
 Kim Parent – backing vocals (2-12)
 Curtis Young – backing vocals (2-12)
 Linda Davis – lead vocals (8)

Production 
 Tony Brown – producer (1)
 Tim DuBois – producer (1)
 David Malloy – producer (2-12)
 Reba McEntire – producer (2-12)
 Kevin Beamish – recording, engineer, mixing
 Derek Bason – recording, mix assistant, assistant engineer
 Scott McCutcheon – recording assistant
 J. R. Rodriguez – recording assistant
 Denny Purcell – mastering

Charts

Weekly charts

Year-end charts

Singles

Certifications and sales

References

1998 albums
Reba McEntire albums
MCA Records albums
Albums produced by David Malloy